The Electoral district of Wonthaggi was an electoral district of the Legislative Assembly in the Australian state of Victoria.

Members

Election results

References

Former electoral districts of Victoria (Australia)
1927 establishments in Australia
1955 disestablishments in Australia